Salvation is the state of being saved or protected from harm or a dire situation.

Salvation may also refer to:

Film and television

Film 
 Salvation!, a 1987 American black comedy film
 Salvation (2008 film), a 2008 Australian film
 The Salvation (film), a 2014 Danish Western film
 Terminator Salvation, a 2009 film in the Terminator series

Television 
 Salvation (TV series), a 2017 American television series
 "Salvation", a 2002 episode of Alias (season 2)
 "Salvation", a 2006 episode of Supernatural (season 1)
 "Salvation", the 2010 finale of Smallville (season 9)
 "Salvation", a 2013 episode of Arrow (season 1)

Music
 Salvation (band), a late-1960s American psychedelic rock band 
 Salvation (musical), a 1969 Off-Broadway rock musical

Albums
 Salvation (Alphaville album), 1997
 Salvation (Cult of Luna album), 2004
 Salvation (Bill Hicks album), 2005
 Salvation (Byzantine video album), 2007
 Salvation (Smack album), 1987
 The Salvation (album), by Skyzoo, 2009

Songs
 "Salvation" (The Cranberries song), 1996
 "Salvation" (Gabrielle Aplin song), 2013
 "Salvation" (GuGabriel song), 2012
 "Salvation" (ManuElla song), 2017
 "Salvation" (Rancid song), 1995
 "Salvation" (Roxette song), 1999
 "Salvation", a song by Black Rebel Motorcycle Club from B.R.M.C., 2001
 "Salvation", a song by Bongzilla from their album Apogee, 2000
 "Salvation", a song by the Devil Wears Prada from Dear Love: A Beautiful Discord, 2006
 "Salvation", a song by Elton John from Honky Château, 1972
 "Salvation", a song by Michael Learns to Rock from Michael Learns to Rock, 2004
 "Salvation", theme song by John Van Tongeren to the American TV series The 4400

Other uses
 Salvation (novel), a 1999 Doctor Who novel
 Salvation, a 2018 novel by Peter F. Hamilton in the Salvation sequence
 Salvation (video game), unreleased 
 Salvation (wrestler), ring name of Jesse Neal (born 1980)
 Salvation Group, a former British media company

See also 

 Save (disambiguation)
 Solvation, the interaction of solvent with dissolved molecules
 The Salvation Army, a Christian church and charitable organisation